The 2009 Pakistani Embassy attack in Tehran occurred when the Embassy was overran by the Iranian protesters who stoned the Embassy building after learning the news of slaying of a worker at the Iranian consulate in Peshawar, North-West Frontier Province, Pakistan. According to the news sources, the protesters held placards noting "anti-Pakistan slogans." The order was quickly restored and the governments of Iran and Pakistan worked to maintain calm diplomatic relations.

References

2009 in international relations
2009 in Pakistan
2000s in Tehran
Embassy attack in Tehran, 2009
Attacks on buildings and structures in 2009
Attacks on diplomatic missions in Iran
Tehran, 2009
Crime in Tehran
February 2009 crimes
February 2009 events in Asia
Embassy attack in Tehran, 2009
Terrorist incidents in Iran in 2009
Attacks in Iran in 2009